"Ole Lukøje" is a literary fairy tale by Hans Christian Andersen based upon a folk tale telling of a mysterious mythic creature of the Sandman who gently takes children to sleep and, depending on how good or bad they were, shows them various dreams.

Ole Lukøje's name is actually composed of two parts: Ole  is a common Danish masculine name, and Lukøje a compound of the Danish words for 'close' and 'eye'.  In the tale, he visits a boy called Hjalmar every night for a whole week and tells him stories.  Ole Lukøje is later revealed to be a dream god, and in his final tale on Sunday he tells of his brother, likewise called Ole Lukøje but also Death, who closes the eyes of those he visits and takes them away with him.

Ole Lukøje on Death

See also

Wee Willie Winkie

External links 

The entire folk tale in the old Danish original
 

1841 short stories
Danish fairy tales
Fictional gods
Short stories by Hans Christian Andersen
Sandman